Michael S. Wald is an American lawyer currently the Jackson Eli Reynolds Professor of Law, Emeritus at Stanford Law School and an Elected Fellow of the American Law Institute.

Education
BA Cornell University 1963
MA (political science) Yale University Graduate School of Arts and Sciences
LLB Yale Law School 1967

References

Year of birth missing (living people)
Living people
Stanford Law School faculty
American lawyers
Cornell University alumni
Yale Law School alumni